Moosehide (Hän: Ëdhä Dädhëchan) was an Indian reserve of the Tr'ondëk Hwëch'in First Nation or Dawson band in the Canadian territory of Yukon between about 1906 and the early 1960s.

Moose Hide was a village at the time of the 1911 census when it recorded a population of 125.

References 

Former villages in Yukon
Settlements in Yukon